In the Crosswind is a 2014 Estonian drama film directed by Martti Helde. It was screened in the Contemporary World Cinema section at the 2014 Toronto International Film Festival. The film is about the forced deportation by Stalin's Russia of an Estonian family to Siberia in the June deportation. It is based on a real-life diary from the period and uses a long sequence of "living tableaus" for the main narrative to invoke the frozen nature of traumatizing events in an individual memory.

Cast 
 Einar Hillep as Chairman of the Kolkhoz
 Ingrid Isotamm as Hermiine
 Laura Peterson as Erna Tamm
 Mirt Preegel as Eliide
 Tarmo Song as Heldur

See also 
 The Chronicles of Melanie, a similar 2016 Latvian film
 Population transfer in the Soviet Union

References

External links 
 
 Risttuules at Estonian Film Database

2014 films
2014 drama films
Estonian drama films
Estonian-language films
Films shot in Estonia
Films set in 1941
Films about the Soviet Union in the Stalin era
Films about Soviet repression
Works about the Gulag
Films set in Siberia